Ishan Pranav Kishan  (born 18 July 1998) is an Indian international cricketer. He plays for the Indian national cricket team and in the Indian Premier League for Mumbai Indians as a wicket-keeper and batsman. He made his international debut in March 2021 against England. He plays for Jharkhand in domestic cricket. He was the captain of India's squad for the 2016 Under-19 Cricket World Cup.

In December 2022 he scored 210 runs in 131 balls in a One Day International (ODI) match against Bangladesh, becoming both the youngest and the fastest cricketer to score an ODI double century and the first to convert a maiden ODI century to a double century.

Early life
Ishan Kishan was born on 18 July 1998 in Bihar. His father, Pranav Kumar Pandey is a builder by profession in Patna. Due to registration issues between Bihar Cricket Association and the Board of Control for Cricket in India (BCCI), Ishan started playing for neighboring state Jharkhand.

Domestic career
On 6 November 2016, Kishan scored 273 runs against Delhi in the 2016–17 Ranji Trophy, setting a new record for a player for Jharkhand in the competition. He was the leading run-scorer for Jharkhand in the 2017–18 Ranji Trophy, with 484 runs in six matches and in the 2018–19 Vijay Hazare Trophy, with 405 runs in nine matches.

In October 2018, he was named in the India C squad for the 2018–19 Deodhar Trophy, scoring a century in the tournament's final. In February 2019, in the 2018–19 Syed Mushtaq Ali Trophy, he scored an unbeaten century against Jammu and Kashmir. In the next match, against Manipur, he scored 113 not out to record back-to-back centuries in the tournament.

In August 2019, he was named in India Red's squad for the 2019–20 Duleep Trophy and in October in the India A squad for the same competition. In February 2021, on the opening day of the 2020–21 Vijay Hazare Trophy, Kishan scored 173 runs against Madhya Pradesh, part of a record score of 422.

Indian Premier League
In 2016, Kishan was bought by Gujarat Lions in the 2016 IPL auction. In 2018, he was bought by the Mumbai Indians in the 2018 auction. He was the highest run-scorer for Mumbai in the 2020 season, with 516 runs from 14 matches and won the award for hitting the most sixes during the season.

International career
In February 2021, Ishan was named in India's Twenty20 International (T20I) squad for their home series against England. It was his maiden international call-up and he went on to make his debut on 14 March 2021, scoring 56 from 32 balls. He won the player of the match award.

In June 2021, he was named in India's One Day International (ODI) and T20I squads for their tour of Sri Lanka. He made his ODI debut on the tour in July, scoring 59 from 42 balls. In September he was named in India's squad for the 2021 ICC Men's T20 World Cup.

In October 2022, Kishan scored his then ODI career highest score of 93 runs in the second of three ODIs against the touring South Africans before going on to become the youngest―aged 24 years and 145 days―and the fastest player to score a double century in an ODI in December during India's tour of Bangladesh. He scored 210 runs from 131 balls, reaching the 200-run mark in 126 deliveries to beat Chris Gayle's record of 138 balls. He also became the first player to convert a maiden ODI century into a double century, and the fourth Indian player to score a double century in an ODI.

References

External links
 

1998 births
Living people
Indian cricketers
India One Day International cricketers
India Twenty20 International cricketers
Jharkhand cricketers
Gujarat Lions cricketers
India Blue cricketers
Cricketers from Patna
Indian A cricketers
Mumbai Indians cricketers
Wicket-keepers